The 2016 WAC men's basketball tournament was a postseason men's basketball tournament for the Western Athletic Conference, held from March 10–12, 2016 at Orleans Arena in Paradise, Nevada. The winner of the tournament received the conference's automatic bid into the 2016 NCAA tournament.

Seeds
Grand Canyon was ineligible to participate in the conference tournament during its transition to Division I. The remaining seven teams participated in the tournament. The top seed received a bye to the semifinals. 

Teams were seeded by record within the conference, with a tiebreaker system to seed teams with identical conference records.

Schedule

Bracket

References

Tournament
WAC men's basketball tournament
WAC men's basketball tournament
WAC men's basketball tournament
Basketball competitions in the Las Vegas Valley
College basketball tournaments in Nevada
College sports tournaments in Nevada